The Journey of Jared Price is a gay-themed coming-of-age 2000 film written, produced and directed by Academy Award winner Dustin Lance Black and starring Corey Spears, Josh Jacobson, Rocki Cragg, and Steve Tyler. The Journey of Jared Price was Black's first feature film.

Plot
Nineteen year old Jared (Corey Spears) arrives in Los Angeles from a small town in Georgia seeking a different life. When he arrives in L.A., he rents a room in a youth hostel that's furnished with bunk beds and already has one occupant, a male prostitute who needs to use their room to have sex with his clients some times. Jared of course doesn't like this arrangement but it's all he has at the moment.

Jared finally lands a job as a sitter and caregiver to the blind Mrs. Haines (Rocki Cragg). He is hired by her son Matthew (Steve Tyler), who is a movie executive, because he wants someone to spend time with his mother so he won't have to.

Jared meets Robert (Josh Jacobson) at the hostel. Robert is an openly gay teen who soon shows his attraction to Jared. Robert is very comfortable being gay, which leaves Jared feeling the opposite about his own sexual orientation.

The film takes a further twist when Matthew asks Jared to move in with his mother, Mrs. Haines, so that he can also look after her at night. Because of the living situation at the hostel with his prostitute roommate, Jared agrees to move into Mrs. Haines' home. Soon after Jared moving in, it doesn't take long before Matthew gets Jared drunk and the two have sex. After Matthew decides not to give Jared a telephone message from Robert, and after Matthew fails to mention anything about his lover at home, Andrew (Bryan Shyne), to Jared, Jared is faced with a difficult decision. Should he continue his relationship with Matthew or should he leave, ultimately being either homeless and jobless again?

Cast
Corey Spears ...  Jared Price
Steve Tyler ... Matthew Haines
Mark Marsh ...  Hostel Manager 
Jarrad Webster (Jared Lee Webster) ...  Javier 
Josh Jacobson ...  Robert 
Rocki Craigg ...  Mrs. Haines 
Bryan Shyne ...  Andrew 
Gillian Harris ...  Kate

External links
 
 

Films with screenplays by Dustin Lance Black
American LGBT-related films
2000 drama films
LGBT-related coming-of-age films
2000 LGBT-related films
2000 films
2000s English-language films
2000s American films